Elena Emilevna Gilels (September 5, 1948 – June 17, 1996) was a Russian pianist.

The daughter of pianist Emil Gilels, Elena Gilels studied at the Moscow Conservatory under Vera Gornostayeva and Yakov Flier, then with Pavel Serebryakov at the Leningrad Conservatory. Her repertoire focused on the works of Haydn, Beethoven, Mendelssohn, Chopin, Liszt, Schumann, Mussorgsky, Tchaikovsky, Rachmaninoff and Prokofiev. Elena Gilels is perhaps best remembered for her performances of Mozart's piano concertos. She frequently performed with her father Emil Gilels, with whom she recorded Mozart's Concerto for Two Pianos, KV. 365.

References

Literature 
 Grigoryev L. Platek J. "Modern pianists." Moscow, "Soviet composer", 1990

1948 births
1996 deaths
Russian classical pianists
Russian women pianists
Moscow Conservatory alumni
20th-century classical pianists
20th-century classical musicians
Women classical pianists
20th-century women pianists